In engineering, some methods or components make special demands on the system.  The extra design features necessary to meet these demands are called overhead. For instance, in electrical engineering, a particular integrated circuit might draw large current, requiring a robust power delivery circuit and a heat-dissipation mechanism.

Example 
An example from software engineering is the encoding of information and data. The date and time "2011-07-12 07:18:47" can be expressed as Unix time with the 32-bit signed integer 1310447927, consuming only 4 bytes. Represented as ISO 8601 formatted UTF-8 encoded string 2011-07-12 07:18:47 the date would consume 19 bytes, a size overhead of 375% over the binary integer representation. As XML this date can be written as follows with an overhead of 218 characters, while adding the semantic context that it is a CHANGEDATE with index 1.
 <?xml version="1.0" encoding="UTF-8"?>
 <DATETIME qualifier="CHANGEDATE" index="1">
     <YEAR>2011</YEAR>
     <MONTH>07</MONTH>
     <DAY>12</DAY>
     <HOUR>07</HOUR>
     <MINUTE>18</MINUTE>
     <SECOND>47</SECOND>
 </DATETIME>
The 349 bytes resulting from the UTF-8 encoded XML correspond to a size overhead of 8725% over the original integer representation.

See also 
 Overhead (business)

Engineering concepts